R390 road may refer to:
 R390 road (Ireland)
 R390 road (South Africa)